Sara Vilic (born March 29, 1992) is an Austrian triathlete. She finished in third place at the 2013 ITU Triathlon World Cup event in Tiszaújváros.

References

External links
 

1992 births
Living people
Austrian female triathletes
Place of birth missing (living people)
Triathletes at the 2010 Summer Youth Olympics
Triathletes at the 2016 Summer Olympics
Olympic triathletes of Austria
21st-century Austrian women